The 1984–85 UAB Blazers men's basketball team represented the University of Alabama at Birmingham as a member of the Sun Belt Conference during the 1984–85 NCAA Division I men's basketball season. This was head coach Gene Bartow's 7th season at UAB, and the Blazers played their home games at BJCC Coliseum. They finished the season 25–9, 11–3 in Sun Belt play and lost in the semifinals of the Sun Belt tournament. They received an at-large bid to the NCAA tournament as No. 7 seed in the Midwest region. The Blazers defeated Michigan State in the opening round before falling to No. 2 seed and eventual Final Four participant Memphis State in the round of 32, 67–66.

Roster

Schedule and results

|-
!colspan=9 style=| Regular season

|-
!colspan=9 style=| Sun Belt tournament

|-
!colspan=9 style=| NCAA tournament

Rankings

Awards and honors
Gene Bartow – Sun Belt Coach of the Year

References

UAB Blazers men's basketball seasons
UAB
UAB